6 Voltios is a Peruvian punk rock band formed in 1998 that currently consists of Alexis Korfiatis, Marcel Caillaux and Mauritius Llona. The band won popularity since 1999, when they released their debut-album Desde el sótano. 6 Voltios has released 6 studio albums, all with the approval of the Peruvian and Latin population.

Band members
Current members
Alexis Korfiatis – lead vocals, guitar (1998–present)
Álvaro Charapaqui – drums, backing vocals (2013–present)
César Ríos – bass guitar, backing vocals (2013–present)

Former members
Emilio Bruce – bass guitar (1998–2009;2013-2013)
Mauricio Llona – drums, backing vocals (1998–2013)
Marcel Caillaux – bass guitar, backing vocals (2009–2013)

Discography
 1999 – Desde el sótano
 2001 – Generación Perdida
 2002 – Tan solo una vez más
 2003 – Día Plástico
 2006 – Descompresión
 2010 – 5 canciones que nunca debieron salir

Peruvian punk rock groups
1998 establishments in Peru
Musical groups established in 1998